Arthur Hayday (24 October 1869, in London – 28 February 1956) was an English Labour Party politician.

After learning his trade as a chemical trimmer and stoker, Hayday became involved in the National Union of General Workers, of which he was an official for many years. He served as President of the Trades Union Congress from 1930 to 1931.

In December 1918, Hayday was elected Member of Parliament (MP) for Nottingham West. Despite a large majority, he lost his seat in a notable loss for Labour in the 1931 general election. In November, 1935 he regained his seat. He served as Parliamentary Private Secretary to the Lord Privy Seal, John Robert Clynes. Hayday retired from Parliament in 1945. He appeared in the newspapers for his work on numerous occasions.

He died in Nottingham on 28 February 1956.

References

External links 
 

1869 births
1956 deaths
British trade unionists
GMB (trade union)-sponsored MPs
Labour Party (UK) MPs for English constituencies
UK MPs 1918–1922
UK MPs 1922–1923
UK MPs 1923–1924
UK MPs 1924–1929
UK MPs 1929–1931
UK MPs 1935–1945
Members of the General Council of the Trades Union Congress
Presidents of the Trades Union Congress